Saúl Ordóñez Gavela (born 10 April 1994) is a Spanish middle-distance runner specialising in the 800 metres. He won a bronze medal at the 2018 World Indoor Championships. Earlier he won a silver at the 2015 European U23 Championships. He holds the Spanish national record in the distance with 1:43.65.

International competitions

Personal bests
Outdoor
400 metres – 48.74 (Palencia 2015)
800 metres – 1:43.65 NR (Monaco 2018)
1500 metres – 3:40.39 (Huelva 2017)
3000 metres – 8:30.48 (Valladolid 2013)	
Indoor
800 metres – 1:46.96 (Karlsruhe 2018)	
1500 metres – 3:44.64 (Dortmund 2018)	
3000 metres – 8:07.37 (Antequera 2015)

References

External links
 
 
 
 

1994 births
Living people
Spanish male middle-distance runners
People from Ponferrada
Sportspeople from the Province of León
Athletes (track and field) at the 2020 Summer Olympics
Olympic athletes of Spain
21st-century Spanish people